Facelina lugubris is a species of sea slug, an aeolid nudibranch, a marine gastropod mollusc in the family Facelinidae.

Distribution
The type locality for this species is Trieste in the Adriatic Sea.

References

Facelinidae
Gastropods described in 1882